Nama rothrockii is a species of flowering plant in the borage family known by the common name Rothrock's fiddleleaf. It is native to the mountains and plateaus of eastern California, such as the southern Sierra Nevada, and western Nevada and Arizona, where it grows in several types of local habitat.

Description
Nama rothrockii is a rhizomatous perennial herb with erect and spreading stems up to about 30 centimeters long. It grows in colonies of clumpy individual plants. It is hairy to bristly, glandular, and sticky in texture. The lance-shaped to narrowly oval green leaves are 2 to 6 centimeters long and lined with regular teeth.

The inflorescence is a somewhat spherical head of flowers with densely hairy sepals. Each funnel-shaped flower is about 1.5 centimeters long and a centimeter wide at the face. The flowers are pink, light to deep purple, or pale blue in color.

External links
Jepson Manual Treatment - Nama rothrockii
Nama rothrockii - Photo gallery

rothrockii
Flora of the Sierra Nevada (United States)
Flora of the California desert regions
Flora of Arizona
Flora of Nevada
Flora without expected TNC conservation status